Wakeboarding Unleashed Featuring Shaun Murray is an extreme sports video game developed by Shaba Games, Small Rockets and Beenox, and published by  Activision under the Activision O2 label and Aspyr for Game Boy Advance, Macintosh, Microsoft Windows, PlayStation 2, Xbox and mobile phones in 2003. It features wakeboarder Shaun Murray.

Reception

The game received "favorable" reviews on all platforms except the Game Boy Advance version, which received "average" reviews, according to the review aggregation website Metacritic. Nintendo Power gave the Game Boy Advance version a mixed review, over two months before its release Stateside. In Japan, where the Xbox version was ported for release on December 25, 2003, Famitsu gave it a score of one six, one five, and two sixes for a total of 23 out of 40.

References

External links
 
 

2003 video games
Activision games
Aspyr games
Beenox games
Game Boy Advance games
JAMDAT Mobile games
Macintosh games
Mobile games
Multiplayer and single-player video games
PlayStation 2 games
Water sports video games
Video games based on real people
Video games developed in Canada
Video games developed in the United Kingdom
Video games developed in the United States
Windows games
Xbox games
Wakeboarding